Koukal is a Czech masculine surname. The feminine form is Koukalová.

It may refer to:
 František Koukal (born 1949), Czech fencer
 Jan Koukal (born 1951), Czech politician
 Jan Koukal (squash player) (born 1983), Czech squash player
 Martin Koukal (born 1978), Czech cross-country skier
 Zdeněk Koukal (born 1984), Czech footballer
 Gabriela Koukalová (née Soukalová) (born 1989), Czech biathlete
 Klára Koukalová (born 1982), Czech tennis player

See also
 
 

Czech-language surnames